Herbert Schreiner (born 23 January 1931) is an Austrian sprint canoer who competed in the early 1950s. At the 1952 Summer Olympics in Helsinki, he was eliminated in the heats of the K-1 1000 m event.

References

1931 births
Austrian male canoeists
Canoeists at the 1952 Summer Olympics
Olympic canoeists of Austria
Living people